Birkenstraße  is a Berlin U-Bahn station located on the  line. It was opened in 1961 by B. Grimmek. There are two entrances to the station, located at the Birkenstraße and Wilhelmshavenerstraße crossroad, on either side of the road. The station's walls are decorated with green tiles in reference to the station's name—the word birke is German for birch tree.

References

U9 (Berlin U-Bahn) stations
Buildings and structures in Mitte
Railway stations in Germany opened in 1961